Mughal war of succession may refer to:
 Mughal war of succession (1627–1628), after the death of emperor Nuruddin Salim Jahangir of the Mughal Empire
 Mughal war of succession (1657–1661), after grave illness of emperor Shah Jahan of the Mughal Empire
 Mughal war of succession (1707–1709), after the death of emperor Aurangzeb of the Mughal Empire
 Mughal war of succession (1712–1720), after the death of emperor Bahadur Shah I of the Mughal Empire

See also 
 Princely rebellion § Mughal Empire, for princely wars against well-established Mughal emperors
 Pandyan Civil War (1169–1177), between Parakrama Pandyan I and his son
 Pandyan Civil war of 1308-1323, after the death of Maravarman Kulasekara Pandyan I
 Marava War of Succession (1720–1729), after the death of raja Raghunatha Kilavan of the Ramnad estate
 Maratha war of succession (1749–1752), after the death of maharaja Shahu I of the Maratha Empire
 Persian war of succession (disambiguation)
 Indian War (disambiguation)